Lee Seung-jae may refer to:
 Lee Seung-jae (film producer), producer of multiple Kim Ki-duk films beginning with the 1998 Birdcage Inn
 Lee Seung-jae (speed skater), competitor for South Korea at the 2002 Winter Olympics
 Lee Seung-jae (footballer) (born 1998), South Korean footballer

See also
Lee Sung-jae (disambiguation)
Seung-jae, a Korean masculine given name